C. Gasquoine Hartley or Catherine Gasquoine Hartley or Mrs Walter Gallican (1866/7–1928) was a writer and art historian with a particular expertise on Spanish art. Latterly she wrote about polygamy, motherhood and sex education.

Life
Hartley was born in 1866 or 1867 in Antananarivo in Madagascar to Reverend Richard Griffiths and Catherine (née Gasquoine) who were from Manchester. Her parents had served as missionaries in Mauritius before they went to Madagascar. Her father left them with a poor financial position when he died in 1870 after the family had returned to Hampshire. Hartley inherited her father's need to teach and she was brought up in Southport where she first worked as a teacher. She rose to be the headteacher at a school in Eltham in Kent in 1894. She left this post to write sometime around 1903. She published Life: the Modeller which was a novel set against her knowledge of art, although its history attracted only minor interest. A second novel, The Weaver's Shuttle, appeared in 1905.

Hartley became the second wife of the journalist and writer Walter M. Gallichan on 9 May 1901. He had written under the name Geoffrey Mortimer. After their marriage her husband wrote under his own name and Hartley assigned her work to "C. Gasquoine Hartley (Mrs Walter Gallichan)", both writing about their leisurely lifestyle. They had a house in Youlgreave in Derbyshire where they put together The Story of Seville which was published as part of The Medieval Towns series of guides. The illustrations for the book were made by Hartley's sister, Elizabeth.

In 1904 she published Pictures in the Tate Gallery. In the same year her husband published Fishing and Travel in Spain; this was matched by Hartley's book A Record of Spanish Painting which revealed her expertise in Spanish art. She created some controversy concerning her lack of attribution in a case pursued by Edward S. Dodgeson. Her husband joined in the correspondence in 1907 which itemised points of fact and attribution that Dodgson felt that Hartley had overlooked and this dispute was published by The Academy magazine. During this time she was writing articles about contemporary artists such as the British painter John Collier for The New Age.

Hartley continued to write books with Albert Calvert on the Spanish Prado Museum and the Spanish painters Velázquez and El Greco. Their books were favourably reviewed at home, in Spain and the United States. In 1910 she took an interest in Galicia which began with a trip organised by the British International Association of Journalists. Her advocacy for the region saw her publish Spain Revisited: a Summer Holiday in Galicia in 1911 (which was translated into Galician in 1999). Her 1912 publication The Story of Santiago de Compostela was much more controversial. Nine years after it was published she and its publisher were successfully sued for plagiarism by Annette Meakin. Meakin showed that Hartley's book was too similar to her book Galicia, the Switzerland of Spain. As part of the settlement Hartley's book was removed from libraries. In 1913, she published her final book on Spain, The Cathedrals of Southern Spain.

Hartley's husband had published Modern Woman and How to Manage Her in 1909 and he continued to publish controversial titles about women, polygamy and sex education. Before they divorced in 1915, Hartley adopted a son, Leslie, who had been born in 1904.  Single again, she investigated new areas in her writing where she investigated social issues including motherhood and sex. In 1916 she wrote Children of the Empire with her new husband Arthur Daniel Lewis. Her latter works were The Position of Women in Primitive Society, Motherhood and the Relationships of the Sexes, Woman's Wild Oats: Essays on the Re-fixing of Moral Standards, Divorce (Today and Tomorrow), Mind of the Naughty Child and latterly Women, Children, Love and Marriage in 1924.

She was hit by a van in 1928 and as a result died on 9 June. Hartley was buried in the Willesden Jewish Cemetery next to her second husband.

Selected works
Pictures in the Tate Gallery, 1904
The Story of Seville (with Gallichan)
A Record of Spanish Painting, 1904
The Weaver's Shuttle, 1905
Spain Revisited: a Summer Holiday in Galicia, 1911
The Story of Santiago de Compostela, 1912 (plagiarist)
The Cathedrals of Southern Spain, 1913
Children of the Empire (with Lewis)
The Position of Women in Primitive Society, 1914
Motherhood and the Relationships of the Sexes, 1917
Woman's Wild Oats: Essays on the Re-fixing of Moral Standards, 1919
Things seen in Spain, 1921
Divorce (Today and Tomorrow), 1921
Mind of the Naughty Child, 1923
Women, Children, Love and Marriage, 1924

References

External links 

 modjourn.org

1860s births
1928 deaths
20th-century British non-fiction writers
20th-century British novelists
British art historians
British family and parenting writers
British relationships and sexuality writers
British women novelists
British women travel writers
British travel writers
Burials at Willesden Jewish Cemetery
Heads of schools in England
People from Antananarivo
People involved in plagiarism controversies
Women art historians